Eucalyptus granitica, commonly known as the granite ironbark, is a species of tree that is endemic to Queensland. It has dark grey or black "ironbark" on the trunk and branches, glossy green, lance-shaped to curved adult leaves, flower buds in groups of seven, white flowers and cup-shaped to barrel-shaped fruit.

Description
It has hard or soft, dark grey to black ironbark on the trunk and branches. Flowering has mostly been recorded between July and September and the flowers are white.

Taxonomy and naming
Eucalyptus granitica was first formally described in 1991 by Ken Hill and Lawrie Johnson from a specimen collected near Atherton on the road to Herberton. The description was publish in the journal Telopea. The specific epithet is derived from the neo-Latin word graniticus, relating to granite, referring to the usual habitat of this species.

Distribution and habitat
Granite ironbark is common on undulating country, growing in granite and volcanic soils from the Atherton Tableland to Paluma.

Conservation status
This eucalypt is classified as "least concern" under the Queensland Government Nature Conservation Act 1992.

See also
List of Eucalyptus species

References

Trees of Australia
granitica
Myrtales of Australia
Flora of Queensland
Plants described in 1991
Taxa named by Lawrence Alexander Sidney Johnson
Taxa named by Ken Hill (botanist)